CY GIRLS (also known as CY Girls or Cy Girls, and as COOL GIRL in Japan) is an action figure series by Takara Tomy and Blue Box Toys under the brand bbi collectible (an official bootleg), featuring an elite unit of female crimefighters, combining the elements of both a doll and an action figure. A Cy Girls video game adaptation (known as Cool Girl in Japan) was developed and published by Konami for the PlayStation 2 in 2004.

Action figures 
The original variation of the dolls (ver. 1.5) features 16 points of articulation (joints) that allows the arms and legs to move out to the sides into a spread position, with movable shoulders, elbows, thighs, knees, ankles, wrists and a neck, featuring interchangeable hands, a detailed nude torso, and pivoting ankles. These dolls are featured in Action Girls: 12" Female Action Figure Guide Book .

In Cy Girls' fictional futuristic universe, the Cardinal-Garrison paramilitary group is an elite all-woman team comprises experts in various fields chosen from around the world. It is a secret global fighting organization established to combat criminal conspiracy and activity, rumoured to have come into existence during World War II. Their vehicles and other equipment witnessed at the scene of the incidents in which they went into action bore the Cardinal-Garrison 'CG' logo, and since the existence of Cardinal-Garrison was unknown, the group became known as the "Cy Girls".

The CG characters series includes the following characters:
CG-01 Sky a.k.a. Ice (also in the versions CG-EX1 Special Branch a.k.a. Ice Black Unit, CG-1 PS2 Ice, PS2 SE Box Ice and Cardinal Garrison Ver.)
CG-02 Jet a.k.a. Raven (also in the version CG-EX2 Law Enforcement (a.k.a. Raven Police coat))
CG-03 Kat a.k.a. Ash (also in the versions CG-EX3 Martial Arts (a.k.a. Ash Wild Wamp) and Alternative Ash)
CG-04 Blaze a.k.a. Flame
CG-05 A.J.McLeod a.k.a. Lightning
CG-06 Shadow a.k.a. Aska (sometimes referred to as "Asuka") (also in the versions CG-06 PS2 Aska and Aska Non Adopted Design Ver.)
CG-07 Nikki a.k.a. Harley  (also in the version Alternative Harley)
CG-08 Ebony a.k.a. Coffy
CG-09 Aurora  a.k.a. Artemis
CG-10 Destiny a.k.a. P.A.S.
CG-11 Revenger a.k.a. Ray
CG-12 Electra a.k.a. Ruby (also in the version Alternative Ruby)
CG-0 Silver
X-Borg X01 Colossus
X-Borg X02 Spectre
X-Borg X03 Fireblade
XX-01 Bloody Rose a.k.a. Xixox (also in the version ComicCon Xixox)

In addition to the Cool/Cy Girls line, Takara and BBI released figures available under the Cool Girl brand name with the same trademark logo. This line includes the following licensed ("tribute") characters:

Akiko Fuji and Annu Yuri from Ultraman
Anna Ishikawa from SHI
Asuka Langley, Misato Katsuragi and Ritsuko Akagi from Neon Genesis Evangelion
Batman and Catwoman (also Comic Ver.) from Batman Returns / DC Comics
Beka Valentine from Andromeda
Casshern, Casshern Sin Project and Kamiko Aso "Luna" from C A S S H E R N
Deunan Knute from Appleseed
Doronjo from Yatterman
Honey Kisaragi (CG-SP1 Cutei Honey, Ex and Alternative versions) from Cutie Honey
Joanna Dark (Black Suit and Armor Suit versions) from Perfect Dark
Jun (CG-SP2 G3 Jun Gatchaman Princess, Jun G3 Alternative and Dark Jun G3 versions) from Science Ninja Team Gatchaman
Kai Tetsuro, Kouchi Todome, Midori Washio and Souchiro Toribe from Kerberos Panzer Cop
Mai Shiranui from The King of Fighters
Motoko Kusanagi (Ninja Suit Ver. and Op.ver.) from Ghost in the Shell: Stand Alone Complex

The second type of Cy Girls figures is known as the Perfect Body Female. These dolls molds were not based on the ones produced by Takara Tomy and instead they were manufactured and produced independently by Blue Box Toys, featuring 26 points of articulation based on the basic design of the Ultimate Soldier. This double-jointed feature on the knees and elbows enables them to be posed in the lotus position and any other conceivable position the human body is capable of. There are two interchangeable busts of medium and large sizes with nipples molded on them (the large bust was discontinued and replaced with a much smaller one that was almost flat chested), pivoting ankles and interchangeable hands, designed to hold any weapons or accessory. The products are packaged in a transparent box with a silver painted plastic strip covering the extra bust and the doll is dressed in a grey work-out sports bra with matching shorts.

Video game

Plot 
CY Girls the game tells a spy-fi story of CG-1 Ice (voiced by Michelle Ruff), the genius hacker and firearms expert on the mission to destroy an information file in the highly secure corporate building in Buenos Aires (where she is navigated by her partner Sancho), and CG-6 Aska (voiced by Mari Iijima), a master female ninja with astonishing athletic ability attempting to avenge the death of her father in a secret village in Japan (where she is navigated by her brother Kogetsu).

While only Ice and Aska are made available as player characters, other CG members also appear in the game. Aska is also a hidden character in the 2003 video game DreamMix TV World Fighters for PlayStation 2 and Nintendo GameCube.

Gameplay 

Gameplay for CY Girls combines puzzle-solving with two distinctly different combat styles: ninja-oriented melee combat and stealth for Aska, and firearms combat for Ice. Essentially, the game was two different games depending on the character choice, as the game was released as a 2-disc package, containing Aska's data on one disc and Ice's data on the other. After completing the main story on a disc, additional characters from the story were unlocked, as well as an 'Extra Mode', where players could choose any combination of weapons, any unlocked character, or any outfit.

In addition, all unlocked characters had the ability to 'dive' into the world of cyberspace (referred to in game as Cyber Dimension, or Cy-D). Within Cy-D, standard moves were disabled, forcing all characters to resort to using punches and kicks to defeat enemies within the domain. In addition, players would have a maximum of 10 minutes within Cy-D before reaching game over (explained in-game as being the amount of time the character could remain within Cy-D without suffering a complete mental breakdown.)

Reception 

The game received "mixed" reviews according to the review aggregation website Metacritic. In Japan, Famitsu gave it a score of 26 out of 40.

Ice and Aska were featured in Plays girls of gaming special in 2003. In 2009, GamesRadar+ counted Cy Girls among the games "with untapped franchise potential," commenting that the game "failed in many ways, with half-formed ideas and shoddy level design that had the player incessantly backtracking through levels." It also included the game on its list of the top shower scenes in games in 2012.

See also
ZC Girls

References

External links 
 CY Girls product line on the bbi collective website
  Official CG website by Takara
 The Cy Girl/Cool Girl Collector's Guide to Ebay

Video game 
 
 Konami's Cy Girls Insider (also about the figures)
 
 
 Cy Girls at Giant Bomb

2004 video games
Action figures
Action-adventure games
Fictional law enforcement agencies
Konami games
Video games about ninja
Playscale figures
PlayStation 2-only games
Stealth video games
Science fiction games
Third-person shooters
Takara Tomy
Takara Tomy franchises
Video games based on Takara Tomy toys
Video games featuring female protagonists
Cyberpunk video games
PlayStation 2 games
Video games developed in Japan